William Cook (6 December 1891 – 22 September 1969) was an English cricketer. He played 39 first-class matches for Surrey between 1921 and 1933.

See also
 List of Surrey County Cricket Club players

References

External links
 

1891 births
1969 deaths
English cricketers
Surrey cricketers
People from Walworth
Cricketers from Greater London
Minor Counties cricketers
Civil Service cricketers
English civil servants